Henry Cartwright (1 September 1814 – 26 July 1890) was a British Conservative Party politician.

Cartwright was the second of five children of former Northamptonshire and South Northamptonshire Tory and Conservative MP William Ralph Cartwright and Julia Frances Aubrey, daughter of Richard Aubrey. He married Jane Holbech, daughter of former Banbury MP William Holbech, in 1853 at Farnborough in Warwickshire.

After education at Eton College, Cartwright first joined the army as an ensign in the Grenadier Guards in 1832, rising to captain in 1846, and colonel in 1854. He sold out in 1857.

Cartwright followed his father into politics when he was elected MP for South Northamptonshire at a by-election in 1858. He held the seat until he stood down in 1868.

References

External links
 

Conservative Party (UK) MPs for English constituencies
UK MPs 1857–1859
UK MPs 1859–1865
UK MPs 1865–1868
1814 births
1890 deaths